Taévaunn Prince (born July 6, 1991) is a Canadian-Jamaican professional basketball player who is currently a free agent. Raised in Toronto, Prince finished his collegiate basketball career at Missouri Southern State University, where he was named NABC First Team All-American while leading the entire NCAA in scoring in 2016.

Professional career
After going undrafted in the 2016 NBA draft, Prince signed with the German team Scanplus Baskets Elchingen of the ProB, the third tier basketball league in Germany. In his first professional game, he scored 24 points in a 105–74 victory to Wurzburg. He recorded his first professional double-double as he recorded 29 points and 10 rebounds in a 97–92 win over Licher Baren. He lamented that his stint in Germany was a successful one despite the adjustments that had to be dealt with.

3x3 career
Prince played 3x3 basketball for the Jamaica men's national 3x3 team at the 2021 FIBA 3x3 AmeriCup, where the country finished sixth.

Personal life
His motto in life is: "My motto is do or die. Everything I approach is do or die, my contract is do or die. It’s an underdog mentality and I’m just trying to get to the top."

References

External links
eurobasket.com profile
Missouri Southern Lions bio

1991 births
Living people
Basketball players from Toronto
Canadian expatriate basketball people in Germany
Canadian expatriate basketball people in Spain
Canadian expatriate basketball people in the United States
Canadian men's basketball players
Missouri Southern Lions men's basketball players
Point guards
South Dakota State Jackrabbits men's basketball players
AS Police basketball players